Oractiidae is a family of sea anemones belonging to the order Actiniaria.

Genera:
 Oceanactis Moseley, 1877 (synonym Oractis McMurrich, 1893)

References

Actinioidea
Cnidarian families